The Canadian Pacific Railway Coast Service, also known as the British Columbia Coast Steamships (BCCS),  was a division of Canadian Pacific Railway (CPR), which began operating Pacific coastal shipping routes in the late 19th century.  The development of coastal passenger and cargo shipping routes extended from British Columbia to Alaska and to Seattle, Washington in the United States.

CPR overview
In 1884, CPR began purchasing sailing ships as part of a railway supply service on the Great Lakes. Over time, CPR became a railroad company with widely organized water transportation auxiliaries including the Canadian Pacific Railway Upper Lake Service (Great Lakes), the trans-Pacific service, the British Columbia Coast Service, the British Columbia Lake and River Service, the trans-Atlantic service, and the Ferry service.  In the 20th century, the company evolved into a transcontinental railroad which operated two transoceanic services which connected Canada with Europe and with Asia. The range of CPR services were aspects of an integrated plan.

British Columbia Coast Steamships

In 1901, CPR purchased the Canadian Pacific Navigation Company and began to expand its fleet,  its routes, its infrastructure and its integrated rail service and trans-Pacific connections.

Many of CPR's coastal ships came to be called "pocket liners" because they  offered amenities like a great ocean liner, but on a smaller scale. The names of these vessels began with the title "Princess"; and the Princess fleet developed as an eponym in the first half of the 20th century.

In 1913, 10 of the 12 Princess ships in the coastal fleet had been built to the orders of James William Troup, who was superintendent of CPR's Pacific coastal division. Troup's leadership marked the growth of BCCS until his retirement in 1928.

Among the highlights of Princess fleet's service was in 1915 when the 30th Battalion of the Canadian Expeditionary Force (CEF) embarked from Victoria, British Columbia sailing to the War in Europe.

See also
 CP Ships

Notes

References
 Fournier, Leslie Thomas. (1935). Railway Nationalization in Canada: the Problem of the Canadian National Railways. Toronto: Macmillan. OCLC 424018532
 Hacking, Norman R. (1995). Prince Ships of Northern B.C.: Ships of the Grand Trunk Pacific and Canadian National Railways. Surrey, British Columbia: Heritage House. ;  OCLC 31778600
 __ and W. Kaye Lamb. (1974). The Princess Story: a century and a half of West Coast shipping. Vancouver : Mitchell Press. OCLC 2973754
 Musk, George. (1981).  Canadian Pacific: The Story of the Famous Shipping Line.  Toronto: Holt, Rinehart and Winston of Canada. ;  OCLC 7540915
 Turner, Robert D. (1974). The Pacific Princesses: an illustrated history of Canadian Pacific Railway's Princess fleet on the Northwest Coast. Winlaw, British Columbia: Sono Nis Press.  OCLC 254451187
 __. (1987). West of the Great Divide : an Illustrated History of the Canadian Pacific Railway in British Columbia, 1880-1986. Victoria, British Columbia: Sono Nis Press. ;  OCLC 16019694

Canadian Pacific Railway
Ships of CP Ships